The Dalat shrike-babbler (Pteruthius aeralatus annamensis) is a bird subspecies traditionally considered an aberrant Old World babbler and placed in the family Timaliidae. But as it seems, it belongs to an Asian offshoot of the American vireos and may well belong in the Vireonidae. Indeed, since long it was noted that their habits resemble those of vireos, but this was believed to be the result of convergent evolution.

It is endemic to southern Vietnam on the Da Lat Plateau. It is considered a subspecies of the white-browed shrike-babbler.

References
Collar, N. J. & Robson, C. 2007. Family Timaliidae (Babblers)  pp. 70 – 291 in; del Hoyo, J., Elliott, A. & Christie, D.A. eds. Handbook of the Birds of the World, Vol. 12. Picathartes to Tits and Chickadees. Lynx Edicions, Barcelona.
Biswas, B. 1960. A new name for the Himalayan Red-winged Babbler, Pteruthius. Bulletin of the British Ornithologists' Club 80: 106.  [name for ripleyi]
Reddy, S. 2008. Systematics and biogeography of the shrike-babblers (Pteruthius): Species limits, molecular phylogenetics, and diversification patterns across southern Asia. Molecular Phylogenetics and Evolution 47: 54–72.
Rheindt, F.E., and J.A. Eaton. 2009. Species limits in Pteruthius (Aves: Corvida) shrike-babblers: a comparison between the Biological and Phylogenetic Species Concepts. Zootaxa number 2301: 29–54.

Pteruthius
Endemic birds of Vietnam
Birds described in 1919